Attorney General Stewart may refer to:

Sir John Stewart, 1st Baronet, of Athenree (1758–1825), Attorney General for Ireland
William Morris Stewart (1827–1909), Attorney General of California

See also
General Stewart (disambiguation)